Max Borges Jr., born Max Borges Recio (July 24, 1918 – January 18, 2009), was a Cuban architect best known for his work in Havana in the 1940s and 1950s. He later moved to the United States.

Biography
Borges Jr. was born in Cuba, the son of Max Borges del Junco, an architect. He later studied in the United States, earning his bachelor's degree at Georgia Tech and a master's degree at the Harvard Graduate School of Design. Borges Jr. returned to Cuba and joined his father's firm, together with his brother Enrique.

Borges' style was influenced by his work with Spanish structural engineer Félix Candela who practiced in Mexico and was a specialist in lightweight concrete parabolic structures. Borges invited Candela to work with him in Cuba, and they both developed extraordinary projects. His best known work is the Tropicana Club of 1951, for which he later designed expansions. Other unique buildings like the 1943 Apartment Building of Max Borges-del Junco at Jovellar St. and the Club Náutico place Borges among a few modern architects of the Americas with a recognizable, original style.

After 1959 his family moved to the United States, where he remained active well into the 1980s, along with his brother Enrique, designing and building many residential and commercial buildings in the Washington Metropolitan Area.

Awards

He twice won the Cuban National College of Architects Award. First, for his "Medical and Surgical Center" built in 1948 in El Vedado and, the second time, for the Tropicana Club in 1953. In 2006, he was awarded the Cintas Foundation Lifetime Achievement Award  "The Cintas' legacy has fostered the development of Cuban artists, promoting the professional development of these artists and the continuity of Cuban traditions in art."

Family
He was son of architect Max Borges del Junco, a well-known Cuban architect. His brother was architect Enrique Borges Recio, with whom he authored many works as partner. He married Mignon Olmo-Garrido (March 18, 1923 - May 6, 2007) on February 5, 1944 at San Juan de Letrán Catholic Church in Havana, Cuba and they had two sons, Philip M. and Max M. Borges Olmo (also an architect), as well as five grandchildren.

Notable projects
 House of Santiago Claret - 1941
 House of Martin Fox - 1941
 Apartment Building of Max Borges del Junco - 1943
 House of Paula Maza - 1946
 House of Max Borges Recio - 1948
 Medical & Surgical Center (Centro Medico Quirurgico) - 1948

 Tropicana Club - 1951

 Club Náutico - 1953
 
 Partagas Building - 1954
 Anter Building - 1954
 
 Nunez Bank - 1957
 House of Alberto Borges - 1957
 House of Humberto Tous - 1957

References

 The Havana Guide - Modern Architecture 1925-1965, Eduardo Luis Rodriguez (New York: Princeton Architectural Press, 2000) 
 La Habana, Eduardo Luis Rodriguez, Pepe Navarro (photographer), Blume 1998.
 Directorio Internacional de Familias Cubanas, Volumen XI 1996-1997 
 The Washington Post, May 8, 2007
 Obituary, "The Washington Post", January 21–23, 2009

External links 

Arcos de Cristal

1916 births
2009 deaths
Cuban architects
Harvard Graduate School of Design alumni
Cuban emigrants to the United States
Modernist architects

Architects from Havana